Damien McGrane (born 13 April 1971) is an Irish professional golfer.

Early life and career
McGrane was born in Kells, County Meath, Ireland. He turned professional in 1991.

McGrane has had full status on the European Tour since 2003, and has earned over €3.5m in prize-money. He clinched his first European Tour Title on 20 April 2008 at the Volvo China Open, winning by nine strokes, and ended the 2008 season ranked in the top thirty of the Order of Merit for the first time.

He retired from the European Tour in 2015 after losing his card.

McGrane now plays regularly on the Irish PGA Regional tour. He won the Irish PGA Championship in 2016 and 2019.

Professional wins (8)

European Tour wins (1)

1Co-sanctioned by the Asian Tour

European Tour playoff record (0–1)

PGA MasterCard Tour wins (1)
1999 Wynyard Hall

Other wins (6)
1993 Irish PGA Assistants Championship
1994 Irish PGA Assistants Championship
1999 Irish PGA Southern Championship
2016 Irish PGA Championship
2019 Irish PGA Championship
2022 Irish PGA Championship

Results in major championships

Note: McGrane only played in The Open Championship.
CUT = missed the half-way cut

Team appearances
PGA Cup (representing Great Britain and Ireland): 2000, 2017 (winners)

References

External links

Irish male golfers
European Tour golfers
Sportspeople from County Meath
1971 births
Living people